Museyib Ali oghlu Shahbazov (1898 — 1938) was an Azerbaijani-Soviet party figure and statesman, revolutionary, Commissar of People's Education of the Azerbaijan SSR.

Biography 
Museyib Shahbazov was born in 1898 in Petrovsk-Port city of Dagestan Oblast. After receiving his primary education at a village school, he went to Astrakhan with his father, and after a while he continued his education at a realny school in Derbent.

M. Shahbazov has been interested in public life since school age, joined art circles and read banned books. Gradually, he began to study Marxist literature, attending workers' meetings and rallies. The first periods of his revolutionary activity took place in Dagestan. He was then persecuted by the government and went to Astrakhan. Arriving in Astrakhan in early April 1918, Museyib Shahbazov made contacts with the Muslim branch of the RC(b)P provincial committee headed by Nariman Narimanov and joined the party.

Museyib Shahbazov was sent to study in Moscow under the auspices of the RC(b)P provincial committee. After graduating from the Moscow Red Professorial Institute of Literature, he was mobilized to work in the political department of the XIII Army. From 1918 he worked as a propagandist in the political department of the same army, in Astrakhan he was the secretary of the "Hummet" party, the secretary of the Derbent Revolutionary Committee, the secretary of the RC(b)P South Dagestan and Gaytag-Tabasaran district committees.

M. Shahbazov came to Soviet Azerbaijan in 1921, first worked in the Emergency Commission fighting the counter-revolution, then headed the Ganja Uyezd Executive Committee, worked as Deputy People's Commissar of Justice of the Azerbaijan SSR. From 1923 he worked as the head of the propaganda department of the Central Committee of the AC(b)P, the secretary of the Ganja Uyezd Committee of the AC(b)P.

Museyib Shahbazov was elected rector to the Azerbaijan State University on June 22, 1929. He worked in this position until the beginning of August in the same year.

He was the editor of the "Yeni yol" newspaper and at his initiative, the first "Muallime komek" magazine was published in Azerbaijan in 1934.

In 1935–1936, Commissar of People's Education of the Azerbaijan SSR, Museyib Shahbazov made articles on the importance of passing the Latin alphabet.

M. Shahbazov was elected a member of the Central Committee of the AC(b)P, the Central Executive Committee of the Azerbaijan SSR and the Central Executive Committee of the TSFSR, a member of the Transcaucasian Trade Union Council and the Central Committee of the Trade Union of Educators, he was a representative of the 14th Congress of the AUC(b)P,  and on January 27, 1936, he was awarded the Order of the Red Banner of Labor.

Shahbazov was married to Lyubov Martinovna, had two daughters named Svetlana and Leyla. Leyla Shahbazova was an Honored Lawyer of the Azerbaijan SSR.

Museyib Shahbazov was arrested in September 1937 in the name of "People's Enemy" and shot in 1938. After his death, he was acquitted on September 3, 1955.

References 

Education ministers of Azerbaijan
1898 births
1938 deaths